Ptolemy's intense diatonic scale, also known as the Ptolemaic sequence,
justly tuned major scale, 
Ptolemy's tense diatonic scale, or the syntonous (or  syntonic) diatonic scale, is a tuning for the diatonic scale proposed by Ptolemy, and corresponding with modern 5-limit just intonation.

This tuning was declared by Zarlino to be the only tuning that could be reasonably sung, it was also supported by Giuseppe Tartini, and is equivalent to Indian Gandhar tuning which features exactly the same intervals.

It is produced through a tetrachord consisting of a greater tone (9:8), lesser tone (10:9), and just diatonic semitone (16:15). This is called Ptolemy's intense diatonic tetrachord (or "tense"), as opposed to Ptolemy's soft diatonic tetrachord (or "relaxed"), which is formed by 21:20, 10:9 and 8:7 intervals.

Structure
The structure of the intense diatonic scale is shown in the tables below, where T is for greater tone, t is for lesser tone and s is for semitone:

Comparison with other diatonic scales
Ptolemy's intense diatonic scale can be constructed by lowering the pitches of Pythagorean tuning's 3rd, 6th, and 7th degrees (in C, the notes E, A, and B) by the syntonic comma, 81:80. This scale may also be considered as derived from the just major chord (ratios 4:5:6, so a major third of 5:4 and fifth of 3:2), and the major chords a fifth below and a fifth above it: FAC–CEG–GBD. This perspective emphasize the central role of the tonic, dominant, and subdominant in the diatonic scale.

In comparison to Pythagorean tuning, which has just perfect fifths (and fourths), the Ptolemaic provides just thirds (and sixths), both major and minor (5:4 and 6:5; sixths 8:5 and 5:3), which are smoother and more easily tuned than Pythagorean thirds (81:64 and 32:27), with one minor third (and one major sixth) left at the Pythagorean interval, at the cost of replacing one fifth (and one fourth) with a wolf interval.

Intervals between notes (wolf intervals bolded):

Note that D–F is a Pythagorean minor third or semiditone (32:27), its inversion F–D is a Pythagorean major sixth (27:16); D–A is a wolf fifth (40:27), and its inversion A–D is a wolf fourth (27:20). All of these differ from their just counterparts by a syntonic comma (81:80). More concisely, the triad built on the 2nd degree (D) is out-of-tune.

F-B is the tritone (more precisely, an augmented fourth), here 45:32, while B-F is a diminished fifth, here 64:45.

References

5-limit tuning and intervals
Heptatonic scales
Ptolemy